The Tranquilino Luna House, near Los Lunas, New Mexico, dates from 1882.  It was listed on the National Register of Historic Places in 1975.

It is a large Victorian-style house built of adobe terrones (large slabs).  Its original entry porch was replaced in early 20th century by a two-story four-column portico.

It was a home of the politically powerful Luna family, descendants of Domingo de Luna, and was deemed "probably the best example of an extant adobe Victorian residence in New Mexico".

References

		
National Register of Historic Places in Valencia County, New Mexico
Victorian architecture in New Mexico
Italianate architecture in New Mexico
Houses completed in 1882